The Kentucky–Louisville rivalry refers to the rivalry between the University of Kentucky Wildcats (Kentucky) and the University of Louisville Cardinals (Louisville). The Kentucky–Louisville rivalry is one of the most passionate rivalries, especially in men's college basketball. It is considered one of the most intense rivalries in the NCAA. The intensity of the rivalry is captivated by the proximity of the two schools and the state of Kentucky's interest in college sports.

Men's basketball

The Kentucky–Louisville rivalry has been ranked the 2nd best rivalry in college basketball by Bleacher Report and 3rd best rivalry in all of college sports by Basketball Hall of Fame contributor Dick Vitale. Kentucky and Louisville first played against each other in 1913 but stopped playing each other in the 1920s, playing only twelve times between 1913 and 1983. The rivalry was generally dormant with only occasional matchups until the teams met in the 1983 NCAA tournament.  Since then, the two teams have met each year in late December or early January.

Much like the Iron Bowl, the Kentucky–Louisville rivalry is all the more intense because the two schools have consistently been among the nation's elite men's basketball teams for most of the last 50 years.  Both schools are also two of the most victorious programs in NCAA men's basketball history; Kentucky is #2 on the list of all-time winningest programs in Division I Men's Basketball and Louisville #6.  Kentucky has eight national championships and Louisville three, one having been vacated by the NCAA.  Both schools also sit in the top ten of men's basketball teams that have had athletes to be picked in the first round of the NBA draft. Kentucky has had 46 players selected in the first round, while Louisville has had 24.

History
The rivalry was fueled when Rick Pitino was hired as Louisville's head men's basketball coach in 2001. He served in that same role with Kentucky from 1989 to 1997. In the time that Rick Pitino was the head coach at Louisville from 2001 to 2017, Kentucky has won 12 of its contests and Louisville has won 6 of its contests. Kentucky leads the all-time series with Louisville 37-17, and Kentucky leads the modern series 28-14.  In six tournament meetings as of 2014, Kentucky leads the series four games to two with their most recent win coming in the 2014 sweet sixteen 74-69. The teams met in the 2012 Final Four, and Kentucky defeated Louisville with a score of 69-61 en route to the national title. This was the deepest ever tournament meeting between the two schools and their first tournament meeting since 1984.

Results
Rankings are from the AP Poll (1936–present)

Notes

A 1948 USA Olympic Trial Game
B 1951 NCAA Sweet Sixteen
C 1959 NCAA Sweet Sixteen
D 1983 NCAA Elite Eight
E 1984 NCAA Sweet Sixteen
F 2012 NCAA Final Four
G 2014 NCAA Sweet Sixteen

Wins by location

Game MVP
NOTE: The 2010 game was the inaugural year for the award.  The Bluegrass Sports Commission (BSC) names the Most Valuable Player of the men's basketball game between the University of Kentucky and the University of Louisville.
{| class="wikitable"
!style="background: #e3e3e3;"|Date
!style="background: #e3e3e3;"|Player
!style="background: #e3e3e3;"|Team
!style="background: #e3e3e3;"|Position
!style="background: #e3e3e3;"|Statistics
|-align=center style=";"
| 12-31-2010  || style="text-align:center; ;"|Josh Harrellson
|align=left|Kentucky || Center|C|| 23 Points, 14 Rebounds 
|-align=center style=";"
| 12-31-2011  || style="text-align:center; ;"|Michael Kidd-Gilchrist
|align=left|Kentucky || Small Forward|F|| 24 Points, 19 Rebounds
|-align=center style=";"
| 12-29-2012  || style="text-align:center; ;"|Russ Smith
|align=left|Louisville || Shooting Guard|G|| 21 points, 7 rebounds
|-align=center style=";"
| 12-28-2013  || style="text-align:center; ;"|James Young
|align=left|Kentucky || Small Forward|F|| 18 Points, 10 Rebounds
|-align=center style=";"
| 12-27-2014  || style="text-align:center; ;"|Tyler Ulis
|align=left|Kentucky || Point Guard|G|| 14 Points, 2 Assists
|-align=center style=";"
| 12-26-2015  || style="text-align:center; ;"|Tyler Ulis
|align=left|Kentucky || Point Guard|G|| 21 Points, 8 Assists
|-align=center style=";"
| 12-21-2016  || style="text-align:center; ;"|Quentin Snider
|align=left|Louisville || Guard|G|| 22 Points, 6 Rebounds, 5 Assists
|-align=center style=";"
| 12-29-2017  || style="text-align:center; ;"|Shai Gilgeous-Alexander
|align=left|Kentucky || Point Guard|G|| 24 Points, 5 Rebounds, 4 Assists, 3 Steals
|-align=center style=";"
| 12-29-2018  || style="text-align:center; ;"|Tyler Herro
|align=left|Kentucky || Shooting Guard|G|| 24 Points, 5 Rebounds, 2 Steals
|-align=center style=";"
| 12-28-2019  || style="text-align:center; ;"|Tyrese Maxey
|align=left|Kentucky || Shooting Guard|G|| 27 Points, 7 Rebounds
|-align=center style=";"
| 12-26-2020 || style="text-align:center; ;" |Carlik Jones & David Johnson
|align=left|Louisville || Guard |Jones: G

Johnson: G
| Jones: 20 points, 5 rebounds
Johnson: 17 points, 7 rebounds
|}

Broadcast History

Football

The football rivalry between Kentucky and Louisville started one year earlier than the basketball rivalry but also had a long dormant period.  Kentucky and Louisville first played each other in football in 1912. Kentucky dominated six meetings between the teams from 1912 until 1924, holding Louisville scoreless in all six games, after which the teams stopped playing. In 1994, with former Kentucky player Howard Schnellenberger coaching Louisville, the series was revived after a 70-year dormancy.  Kentucky leads the series currently 19–15 but Louisville leads the Governors Cup series 15-13.

From 1994 to 2006 the annual matchup was the first game of the season for Kentucky and was the first game for all but two of those years for Louisville.  In 2007 the game was moved to the third game of the season when played in Lexington but remained the first game when played in Louisville. Starting in 2014, which marked Louisville's inaugural season in the Atlantic Coast Conference, the Governor's Cup became the last game of the regular season for both teams to coincide with several other ACC-SEC same-state rivalries.

The 2019 game was won by Kentucky 45-13.  Kentucky wide receiver Lynn Bowden Jr. was named MVP of the showdown.

 Other sports 

 Women's basketball: Kentucky leads the series 34–22 as of the 2019-2020 season. Louisville has currently won 4 in a row. The series dates back to the 1911–12 season, long before Kentucky and Louisville's programs became varsity in 1974–75, from which the series has been continuously active. Kentucky's program was halted by University Senate because it was viewed as a sport that was "too strenuous for girls". It wouldn't return to the University of Kentucky until 1974.
 Women's volleyball: Most recently winning 3-0 in Lexington, Kentucky leads the series 30–25 as of 2018 in a series that initially was played every year from 1977 to 2005 except in 1981 and resumed in 2009 after a hiatus.
 Men's soccer: The two men's soccer programs have met 31 times. Kentucky leads 15–14–5. The last meeting between the two was on September 3, 2019 which ended in a 3-0 Louisville win. On February 21, 2020, it was announced that the two teams would play an exhibition game in the new Lynn Family Stadium. This is the new soccer stadium for Louisville City FC. The match was supposed to be played on April 18, the day of Thunder Over Louisville, however, it was cancelled due to growing concerns of COVID-19.
 Baseball''': As of 2020, Kentucky leads the series 63–46-1 in a series dating back to 1925. UofL is currently 11-2 in the last 13 games. In 2017, Louisville won the season series 3–1, including a sweep of Kentucky in the NCAA Tournament Louisville Super Regional. On April 3, 2018 the Wildcats and Cardinals played their last game at Cliff Hagan Stadium. The Cats took that win to a record crowd of 4,798 with an 8-5 win. At the time, both teams were ranked in the top 25 with Louisville being #21 and Kentucky being #10.

See also
 Kentucky Wildcats
 Louisville Cardinals
 Governor's Cup (Kentucky)
 The Rivalry: Red V. Blue
 Traditional athletic rivalries in many countries of the world

References

Kentucky Wildcats men's basketball
Louisville Cardinals men's basketball
College basketball rivalries in the United States
College soccer rivalries in the United States
College sports rivalries in the United States
1912 establishments in Kentucky